Diaphorodoris is a genus of sea slugs, dorid nudibranchs, shell-less marine gastropod mollusks in the family Calycidorididae.

Species 
Species within this genus include:
 Diaphorodoris alba Portmann & Sandmeier, 1960
 Diaphorodoris lirulatocauda Millen, 1985
 Diaphorodoris luteocincta (M. Sars, 1870)
 Diaphorodoris mitsuii (Baba, 1938)
 Diaphorodoris papillata Portmann & Sandmeier, 1960

References

  Fahey S.J. & Valdés A. (2005). Review of Acanthodoris Gray, 1850 with a phylogenetic analysis of Onchidorididae Alder and Hancock, 1845 (Mollusca, Nudibranchia). Proceedings of the California Academy of Sciences. 56(20): 213-273

Calycidorididae
Gastropod genera